Edith Escobar Camacho (born 17 September 1938) is a Mexican politician from the Institutional Revolutionary Party. From 2002 to 2003 she served as Deputy of the LVIII Legislature of the Mexican Congress representing Oaxaca.

References

1938 births
Living people
Politicians from Chiapas
Women members of the Chamber of Deputies (Mexico)
Institutional Revolutionary Party politicians
21st-century Mexican politicians
21st-century Mexican women politicians
Deputies of the LVIII Legislature of Mexico
Members of the Chamber of Deputies (Mexico) for Oaxaca